Shavand (also known as Shāhvand and Shāhvend) is a village in Darjazin-e Olya Rural District, Qorveh-e Darjazin District, Razan County, Hamadan Province, Iran. At the 2006 census, its population was 978, in 232 families.

The 14th-century author Hamdallah Mustawfi listed Shavand (as Ashvand) as one of the main villages in the A‘lam district under Hamadan.

References 

Populated places in Razan County